New York's 76th State Assembly district is one of the 150 districts in the New York State Assembly.

Geography 
District 76 is located in Manhattan, comprising portions of the Upper East Side, Roosevelt Island and Yorkville.

Recent election results

2022

2020
Due to COVID-19 quarantine measures, the Seawright campaign missed the deadline to submit signatures for the Democratic nomination. She instead ran on the "Rise and Unite" party line.

2018

2016

2014

2012

References

76